Science & Global Security is a triannual peer-reviewed academic journal covering research on all aspects of international security. It was established in 1989 and is published by Routledge. The journal is affiliated to Princeton University where its editors-in-chief, Alexander Glaser, Zia Mian, and Pavel Podvig, are based. The journal is published in English accompanied by an integral translation into Russian.

Abstracting and indexing
The journal is abstracted and indexed in:

References

External links

English-language journals
International relations journals
Routledge academic journals
Triannual journals
Publications established in 1989